The Mississippi Sports Hall of Fame and Museum is located in Jackson, Mississippi.  The hall of fame was established in 1961 and is currently located in a museum that displays the achievements of Mississippi athletes. The museum opened on July 4, 1996. It is opposite the Smith-Wills Stadium, former home of several minor-league baseball teams.

Museum
Among the exhibits in the museum are the "Dizzy Dean Museum", the "Viking Classic Exhibit", which gives the history of Mississippi's PGA golf tournament (now known as the Sanderson Farms Championship, and the "Wendy's High School Gallery", which recognizes the Wendy's High School Heisman winners from Mississippi, as well as past and current state champions.

Hall of fame procedures
 Selection guidelines: See footnote
 Eligibility requirements: See footnote

Inductees
For list of inductees by sport, see footnote
For list of inductees by year, see footnote
For alphabetical list of inductees, see footnote

A–J

A
 Billy Ray Adams, 1987
 Warner Alford, 2003
 Pop Allen, 1994
 Lance Alworth, 1988
 Charles Armstrong, 1976
 Henry Armstrong, 2010
 Bonner Arnold, 1978
 Jim Ashmore, 1983

B
 Johnny Baker, 1984
 Lee Baker, 2004
 Coolidge Ball, 2008
 Calvin Barbour, 1975
 Lem Barney, 1986
 Doby Bartling, 1977
 J.E Baxter, 1969
 James "Cool Papa" Bell, 1995
 Mickey Bellande, 1974
 Verlon Marion Biggs, 2002
 J.T. "Blondy" Black, 1976
 Ricky Black, 2019
 Thermon Blacklidge, 1971
 Bernard Blackwell, 2001
 Courtney Blades-Rogers, 2012
 Felix "Doc" Blanchard, 1994
 Don Blasingame, 1980
 Ruthie Bolton, 2014
 Ralph Boston, 1976
 Jeff Bower, 2009
 Denver Brackeen, 1982
 Robert Braddy, 2017
 Leon Bramlett, 1988
 Cowboy Brantley, 2011
 Robert Brazile, 2007
 Billy Brewer, 2018
 Johnny Brewer, 2004
 Sean Brewer, 2016
 Bobby Brien, 1985
 Allen Brown, 2010
 Ray Brown, 2006
 Willie Brown, 1995
 Jackson Brumfield, 2001
 Bill Buckner, 2013
 Ju Burghard, 1970
 Ode Burrell, 1997
 Guy Bush, 1973

C
 Lindy Callahan, 2004
 Buck Cameron, 1987
 Mack Cameron, 1999
 Jack Carlisle, 2004
 Jim Carmody, 2009
 James Ray Carpenter, 2003
 Marino Casem, 1994
 Gene Chadwick, 1973
 William "Billy" Chadwick, 2005
 Van Chancellor, 2005
 Lloyd Clark, 2006
 Will Clark, 2008
 Robert "Ace" Cleveland, 1998
 Rick Cleveland, 2017
 Leroy Braxton "Roy" Cochran, 1997
 Bob Coleman, 2010 
 Reggie Collier, 2008
 Bobby Collins, 2000
 Charlie Conerly, 1966
 Eugenia Conner, 2017
 Hamp Cook, 1996
 Johnie Cooks, 2004
 Hunter Corhern, 1989
 Paul Covington, 2008
 Harry Craft, 1975
 A.G. Crawford, 1972
 Eddie Crawford, 2012
 Bobby Crespino, 1994
 Jack Cristil, 1991
 Hugh Critz, 1963
 Doug Cunningham, 2014

D
 Roland Dale, 1995
 Jim Davenport, 1983
 Wobble Davidson, 1986
 Art Davis, 1981
 Harper Davis, 1980
 Eagle Day, 1981
 Dizzy Dean, 1990
 Mike Dennis, 2015
 Hill Denson, 2008
 Hanford Dixon, 2005
 Kayo Dottley, 1971
 Frank Dowsing, 2010
 Jim Dunaway, 1990
 Marcus Dupree, 2017

E
 Rita Gail Easterling, 2011
 Hal Easterwood, 2005
 Jim Edwards, 1966
 T.B. Ellis, 2002
 Doug Elmore, 1993
 Buddy Elrod, 1975

F
 Jess Fatheree, 1964
 Brett Favre, 2015
 Rockey Felker, 2019
 Nollie Felts, 1967
 Dave "Boo" Ferriss, 1964
 Agnes Fitz-Hugh, 1975
 Charlie Flowers, 1985
 Lee Floyd, 1991
 Joe Fortunato, 1978
 Bill Foster, 2003
 Bobby Franklin, 2005
 Leslie Frazier, 2017
 Doss Fulton, 1986

G
 Tranny Gaddy, 1965
 Mary Gallagher, 2019
 K. P. Gatchell, 1966
 Smylie Gebhart, 1985
 Joe Gibbon, 1979
 Jake Gibbs, 1976
 Kline Gilbert, 1977
 Jimmie Giles, 2013
 Jennifer Gillom, 2008
 Peggie Gillom, 1998
 Gerald Glass, 2013
 Tom Goode, 1990
 Bill Goodrich, 2005
 W. C. Gorden, 1997
 Country Graham, 1963
 Larry Grantham, 1980
 Mildrette Netter Graves, 2003
 Hugh Green, 2009
 Reed Green, 1966
 L. C. Greenwood, 1996
 Jack Gregory, 2000
 Paul Gregory, 1982
 Wilburn Glynn Griffing, 2002
 Sue Gunter, 2003
 Ray Guy, 1994

H
 Goat Hale, 1961
 Parker Hall, 1970
 Sam Hall, 2012
 Slats Hardin, 1991
 Earnest Harrington, 2013
 Lusia Harris-Stewart, 1990
 Lou Hart, 2007
 Bob Hartley, 1994
 Willie Heidelburg, 2016
 Marion L. Henley, 1993
 Carolyn Henry, 2002
 W.E. "Slew" Hester, 1968
 Gene Hickerson, 1979
 Stan Hindman, 1988
 Dick Hitt, 1965
 Joel Hitt, 1972
 Dobie Holden, 1970
 Junie Hovious, 1967
 Bailey Howell, 1977
 Kent Hull, 2003
 Doug Hutton, 1995

I
 Joe S. Iupe, Jr., 2005

J
 Anna Jackson, 2018
 Harold Jackson, 1989
 Kay James, 2016
 Bert Jenkins, 1999
 M.C. Johnson, 1978
 Samye Johnson, 2002
 Mike Jones, 2018
 Orsmond Jordan, Jr., 2001

K–Z

K
 Doug Kenna, Jr., 1970
 Don Kessinger, 1984
 Tyrone Keys, 2009
 Eddie Khayat, 2004
 Robert Khayat, 2000
 Bruiser Kinard, 1961
 Mike Kinnison, 2011
 Steve Knight, 2015
 Ike Knox, Jr., 1964
 Sylvia Howell Krebs, 1996

L
 Wendell Ladner, 1988
 A.C. "Butch" Lambert, Sr., 2000
 Jimmy Lear, 1991
 Hal Lee, 1974
 Earl Leggett, 2002
 Sam Leslie, 1968
 D.D. Lewis, 1987
 Ken Lindsay, 2001
 Freddie Little, 1995
 James Harol Lofton, 1999
 Carla Lowry, 1985

M

 Carl Maddox, 1989
 Jeffrey Malone, 2012
 Con Maloney, 2011
 Archie Manning, 1989
 Fred McAfee, 2015
 Deuce McAllister, 2014
 Babe McCarthy, 1974
 Jimmie McDowell, 1999
 Bucky McElroy, 1981
 David McIntosh, 1973
 Allyn McKeen, 1977
 Eric McNair, 1963
 Steve McNair, 2014
 Shorty McWilliams, 1963
 Eddie Merrins, 2000
 Abe Mickal, 1985
 Cary Middlecoff, 1996
 Mary Mills, 1987
 Crawford Mims, 1995
 Willie Mitchell, 1966
 Bilbo Monaghan, 1996
 John Montgomery, 1974
 Wilbert Montgomery, 2019
 Bucky Moore, 1965
 Robert Morgan, 2009
 George Morris, 1983
 Dot Easterwood Murphy, 1999
 Buddy Myer, 1971
 Larry Myricks, 2001

N
 Thomas Neville, Jr., 1984
 Jack Nix, 1988
 Dudy Noble, 1961

O
 Roy Oswalt, 2019
 Don Owens, 2004

P
 Rafael Palmeiro, 2012 
 Corky Palmer, 2011
 Jackie Parker, 1972
 Claude Passeau, 1964
 Jimmy Patton, 1972
 Walter Payton, 1993
 Hugh Pepper, 1977
 Ray Perkins, 1998
 Bubba Phillips (John Melvin Phillips), 1972
 George Pillow, 1983
 Ron Polk, 1998
 Barney Poole, 1965
 J.E. "Buster" Poole, 1964
 Ray Poole, 1968
 Johnny Pott, 1993
 Jay Powell, 2017
 Richard Price, 2019
 Ennis Proctor, 2012
 Vic Purvis, 2006

R
 Walter Reed, 1999
 Anton Reel, 2006
 Andy Reese, 1969
 Joe Renfroe, 1982
 Nick Revon, 1985
 Jerry Rice, 2007
 Willie Richardson, 1979
 Troy Ricks, 2007
 Stanley Robinson, 1961
 Langston Rogers, 2013
 John Rubenstein, 2013
 Charles Rugg, 2005

S
 Lester Sack, 1991
 Billy Sam, 1965
 Tom Sawyer, 1992
 Donald Scott, 1963
 George "Boomer" Scott, 2007
 George Sekul, 2002
 Billy Shaw, 1996
 Jackie Sherrill, 2016
 Purvis Short, 1999
 Jackie Slater, 2003
 Calvin Smith, 2014
 Larry Smith, 2016
 Ralph "Catfish" Smith, 2002
 Riley Smith, 1984
 Tad Smith, 1969
 Leroy "L.T." Smith, 1998
 Lake Speed, 2010
 William Spencer, 1968
 Jack Spinks, 1984
 Billy Stacy, 1979
 Bob Stevens, 2003
 Hook Stone, 1967
 Lafayette Stribling, 2018
 John Stroud, 2009
 Red Stroud, 1990
 Clyde Stuart, 1968
 Scott Suber, 1993
 Walter Suggs, 2006
 Walter "Polie" Sullivan, 1973
 Bull Sullivan, 1984
 Tom Swayze, 1978

T
 Michael D. "Mike" Taylor, 1997
 Pete Taylor, 1990
 Marvin Terrell, 2001
 Chuck Thomas, 1975
 Kenneth Toler, 2010
 Willie Totten, 2004
 MK Turk, 2005

U
 P. W. "Bear" Underwood, 1986
 Delbert Bernard "Del" Unser, 1997

V
 B.O. Van Hook, 1981
 Thad Vann, 1971
 Johnny Vaught, 1976
 Dorothy Vest, 1980
 Sam Vick, 1967

W
 Lily Wade, 1974
 Gerald "Gee" Walker, 1969
 Joe Walker, 2018
 Wesley Walls, 2016
 Carl Walters, Sr., 1993
 Fred Walters, 1971
 Charlie Ward, 1979
 Skeeter Webb, 1978
 Hunter G. Weddington, 1983
 Clarence Weatherspoon, 2015
 Paul Wells, 1970
 Gwen White, 2015
 Willye White, 1981
 Dave Whitney, Sr., 1991
 "Gentle" Ben Williams, 1997
 Richard Williams, 2014
 Jerrel Wilson, 2011
 Pat Wilson, 1969
 Spec Wilson, 1967
 Sammy Winder, 1998
 Archie Wright-Moore, 2018

References

External links
Mississippi Sports Hall of Fame and Museum - official website
Alabama-Mississippi Chapter, (US Lacrosse) National Lacrosse Hall of Fame

Sports museums in Mississippi
Halls of fame in Mississippi
State sports halls of fame in the United States
All-sports halls of fame
Sports in Jackson, Mississippi
Museums in Jackson, Mississippi
Awards established in 1961
Buildings and structures completed in 1996